Bai Jing (4 June 1983 – 28 February 2012) was a Chinese actress. She was best known for her role in the 2010 film Kung Fu Wing Chun in which she played the Chinese folk heroine Yim Wing-chun.

Background
Bai Jing graduated from Central Academy of Drama in 2002 and later joined China National Theatre of Children. She made her acting debut in the 2007 television series Xue Se Xiang Xi. She practiced Wing Chun from Ip Chun, in preparation for her role of Yim Wing-chun in the 2010 film Kung Fu Wing Chun.

Personal life
Bai Jing and Zhou Chenghai, a billionaire businessman who made his fortune in investments, first met in 2004, back then Zhou was still married to another woman with whom he had a son. Zhou invested a large sum of money into Bai's acting career. In order to marry her, Zhou divorced his wife in 2006, despite his mother and friends' objections.

Zhou and Bai registered their marriage in March 2008, and they married in October 2010, despite Zhou's mother continuous objections. In 2011, Zhou, Bai and the fitness instructor Qiao Yu went to Hainan for a vacation.

Attempted divorce fraud
After their marriage, Bai Jing got into an extra-marital affair with Qiao Yu and both colluded to con her husband out of 9.6 million rmb and an Audi A8. They even took a video of Zhou's alleged unfaithfulness by hiring a prostitute to seduce him to set up a divorce fraud to get alimony from Zhou.

In the first day of the January 2012, Bai Jing met Zhou's mother at the hospital and told her about her intention to divorce her son. Zhou's mother, upon hearing this, suffered a heart attack and died, this further drifted apart Bai and Zhou relationships.

On 13 February 2012, Bai Jing submitted her divorce proceedings to the Beijing Chaoyang District People's Court, stating that Zhou had a mistress, in possession of pornographic materials, committed domestic violence and many others. She also stated that she was unaware that Zhou had a previous marriage and a son.

Death 
On 28 February 2012, Bai Jing met with Zhou in their apartment in Chaoyang regarding their divorce proceedings, however Zhou stabbed her three times and Bai Jing died on the spot. Zhou phoned his secretary, saying that "白静太狠了，没有退路了" ("Bai Jing is too vicious, no turning back [for him] now"). He took his own life shortly afterwards. Qiao Yu was eventually sent to prison for his collusion with Bai Jing for fraud.

Filmography

References

External links 
 

1983 births
2012 deaths
21st-century Chinese actresses
Actresses from Liaoning
Central Academy of Drama alumni
Chinese film actresses
Chinese television actresses
Deaths by stabbing in China
People from Tieling